Baron Noel-Buxton, of Aylsham in the County of Norfolk, is a title in the Peerage of the United Kingdom. It was created on 17 June 1930 for the politician Noel Noel-Buxton, who was the second son of Sir Thomas Buxton, 3rd Baronet, of Belfield, and a great-grandson of the philanthropist Sir Thomas Fowell Buxton, 1st Baronet, of Belfield, as well as a great-nephew of Charles Buxton, the father of Sydney Buxton, 1st Earl Buxton.  the title is held by his great-grandson, the fourth Baron, who succeeded his father in 2013.
Another member of the Buxton family is Aubrey Buxton, who was created a life peer as Baron Buxton of Alsa in 1978. He is the son of Leland William Wilberforce Buxton, youngest son of the third Baronet.

Barons Noel-Buxton (1930)
Noel Edward Noel-Buxton, 1st Baron Noel-Buxton (1869–1948)
Rufus Alexander Buxton, 2nd Baron Noel-Buxton (1917–1980)
Martin Connal Noel-Buxton, 3rd Baron Noel-Buxton (1940–2013)
Charles Connal Noel-Buxton, 4th Baron Noel-Buxton (b. 1975)

The heir presumptive is the present holder's uncle, the Hon. Simon Campden Buxton (b. 1945).

See also
Buxton baronets, of Belfield
Earl Buxton

References

Charles Kidd and David Williamson (editors). Debrett's Peerage and Baronetage (1990 edition). New York: St Martin's Press, 1990.

External links

Baronies in the Peerage of the United Kingdom
Noble titles created in 1930
Noble titles created for UK MPs
Buxton family